Mississippi Highway 472 (MS 472) is a two-lane wide state highway in Copiah and Simpson counties, Mississippi. The highway consists of two segments- a western segment that runs from outside of Hazlehurst to Rockport that is signed and state maintained, and an eastern segment which is unsigned and maintained by Simpson County. The route number was created in 1957 and had once extended as far west as Carpenter.

Route description
State maintenance of the highway officially begins about  beyond the center of this intersection. MS 472 heads southeast on a winding road through rolling terrain. For the first , the highway heads through a mix of open fields and woods, with some small homes and churches being located along the road. After that point, the surroundings of the road become more rural with very few homes being present on the road. Before the segment ends, MS 472 reaches a T intersection with Rockport Road in front of a church. MS 472 turns to the east and continues for another  where it ends at an intersection with MS 27 in the community of Rockport.

MS 472 officially resumes in Simpson County, across the Pearl River from Rockport. This section, however is not maintained by the state. The unsigned highway, but officially designated section, begins at the intersection of Shivers Road and Rockport New Hebron Road outside of the community of Schley and in front of an abandoned general store. Shivers Road to the east of this point carries MS 478, but like MS 472, it too is unsigned and not state maintained. MS 472 heads north along the county road before curving to the northeast and merging onto Bridgeport Road. At the community of Bridgeport, at a poultry farm, MS 472 turns onto a road formally named County 472. The road heads through a mostly wooded rural area, generally paralleling the Strong River. It also passes more poultry farms, small houses, and churches. In the community of Pinola, the road and the official state highway designation, ends at an intersection with MS 28 and MS 43.

History
MS 472 was designed in 1957 along its current segments and an additional segment in northwest Copiah County. The additional segment ran from MS 18 at the community of Carpenter, just south of Utica Junior College. Portions of the road were improved to be paved over the next few years until the highway was completely removed from state maps by 1967. The route would not be restored to the state map until 1998, and was only located along the Shady Grove-Rockport segment. The road had not been formally decommissioned, however. County maps published by the state continued to show MS 472 through this time. At least in 1980, a  portion of the eastern segment west from MS 28/MS 43 was state maintained.

Major intersections

References

External links

472
Transportation in Copiah County, Mississippi
Transportation in Simpson County, Mississippi